The Dark Eyes of London is a 1939 British horror film produced by John Argyle and directed by Walter Summers, and starring Béla Lugosi, Hugh Williams, and Greta Gynt. The film is an adaptation of the 1924 novel of the same name by Edgar Wallace. The film is about a scientist named Dr. Orloff who commits a series of murders for insurance money, while periodically disguising himself as the blind manager of a charity to further his scheme.

It was released in November 1939 in Britain, where it became the first British film to receive the "H" rating meaning "Horrific for Public Exhibition" (persons aged 16 or above will only be admitted). It was released in the United States in 1940 by Monogram Pictures under the title The Human Monster.

Plot
In London, Dr. Orloff (Bela Lugosi) runs a life insurance agency where he loans money on his customers' policies.  Scotland Yard begins finding bodies in the Thames River, all of them insured by Orloff with the Dearborn Home for the Blind as their sole beneficiary. This charity Home, which Orloff sponsors and serves as its medical advisor, is located in a dilapidated former warehouse abutting the Thames.

One of the dead men has a daughter named Diane (Greta Gynt) for whom Orloff obtains employment at the Home as seeing-person secretary to the soft-spoken, also blind, Dearborn. Suspicions begin to arise surrounding Dearborn and Orloff in relation to the dead bodies, and it becomes clear to the audience that Dearborn is really Orloff, disguising both his face and voice.

After Diane finds one of her father's cufflinks at the Home, Orloff sends his henchman Jake (Wilfred Walter), a deformed blind resident of the Home, to kill Diane who has found out too much about them but she eludes him with the help of the young police inspector on the case.  Confronted by Diane, Dearborn removes his disguise to show himself as Orloff.

He carries her to the warehouse's loft, where he has been killing his victims by dumping them into a vat of river water charged with electricity. He puts her in a strait-jacket and calls for Jake to finish the job of killing her in like manner.  Jake refuses as he has found out that Orloff has sadistically deafened his one friend, also blind, before killing him. Jake turns on Orloff, Orloff shoots Jake, but Jake perseveres, captures Orloff and throws him out of a loading door, to sink into the river mud-flats below.  The inspector breaks in and frees Diane as Jake dies of his wounds.

Cast

Production
Production began on The Dark Eyes of London in 1938. Actor Bela Lugosi sailed to England to star in the film's dual role of Dr. Orloff and Professor Dearborn (the original novel has two Orloff characters but the film's script combined them into one). When portraying the role of Dearborn, Lugosi's voice is dubbed by O. B. Clarence. It was made at Welwyn Studios with sets designed by the art director Duncan Sutherland. The day after Lugosi arrived on set, shooting began and lasted 11 days. Production ended on the film in 1939.

The final scene involving Orloff's demise was difficult to film. A seven-foot-deep tank was filled with a concoction to resemble river mud. A member of the crew was lowered into the mess with a chain that allowed him to escape easily if he were sucked under. It is intercut with a shot of Lugosi's head sinking, but Lugosi did not submerge. Weights had to be tied to Lugosi's ankles to keep his body sunk.

Release
The film was released in the United Kingdom in October 1939. In the United Kingdom, The Dark Eyes of London was the first British film to receive the 'H' rating and the last British horror film to receive the rating. The "H" rating was introduced in 1933 by the British Board of Film Censors (BBFC) for films labelled "Horrific" for "any films likely to frighten or horrify children under the age of 16 years"

The Dark Eyes of London was released in the United States under the title The Human Monster by Monogram Pictures in March 1940

See also

Bela Lugosi filmography
British films of 1939
List of horror films of the 1930s

References

Notes

External links

 
 
 

1939 films
1939 horror films
1930s crime films
British horror films
British crime films
1930s English-language films
British black-and-white films
Films directed by Walter Summers
Films based on works by Edgar Wallace
Films based on British novels
Films set in London
Films about blind people
Films shot at Welwyn Studios
Films with screenplays by Patrick Kirwan
1930s British films